The 2018 Leinster Senior Football Championship was the 2018 installment of the annual Leinster Senior Football Championship organised by Leinster GAA.

Dublin, the defending champions, won their eighth consecutive championship title, defeating Laois in the final.

Teams
The Leinster championship was contested by 11 of the 12 county teams in Leinster, a province of Ireland. Kilkenny was the only county team not to compete.

Championship draw

Preliminary round

Quarter-finals

Semi-finals

Final

See also
 2018 All-Ireland Senior Football Championship
 2018 Connacht Senior Football Championship
 2018 Munster Senior Football Championship
 2018 Ulster Senior Football Championship

References

External links
 http://www.leinstergaa.ie/

2L
Leinster Senior Football Championship